Catalina Alejandra Vallejos Sepúlveda (born October 10, 1989) is a Chilean model and for winning Miss ATP in 2009 and Calle 7 in 2010 and 2011. She also had a minor role on the telenovela Témpano (2011) and was a cast member on Aquí mando yo (2011−2012), the latter was received with successful ratings and critics reviews.

Career
Vallejos was the Miss ATP from Viña del mar 2009; then she works in various events and beauty pageants, as the Miss Movistar Open in 2009 and also in the Corrida Brooks in 2009 and 2010. In 2010, she competed in the Miss Reñaca. In March 2010, Vallejos joined in Calle 7 as a competitor of the season 3, finishing as a semifinalist. She was the winner of the season 4 with Felipe Camus. Also Vallejos starred in the show miniseries as Gaby.
Between 2008 and 2009, television producers have offered to join major TV shows such as Amor ciego, Yingo and Calle 7, but could not realize these appearances because her University branches, for these reasons she could not enter into Calle 7 until March 2010. Before joining the program, Vallejos was doing a pilot for a cable sports program, but in the end decided to go Calle 7 because long process of the pilot and paperwork. On January 22, 2011, Catalina and Philippe Trillat won Season 5 of calle 7, making Catalina the first woman to win calle 7 twice. After winning season 5 of Calle 7, she came back not as a competitor, but she came to work on calle 7 web. She then left to join the cast of Aquí mando yo. The telenovela aired from September, 2011 to April, 2012. Vallejos came back to Calle 7 in November 2012 to its eleventh season.

Personal life and personal opinions
She is a physical education student at Universidad Andrés Bello (Chile).

She said in her Instagram page that she wouldn't take the COVID-19 vaccine because she "simply doesn't need it" and that she has a "very strong inmune system". Many medical specialists and authorities criticized her comments regarding COVID-19 vaccines as "irresponsible".

Filmography

Modeling titles
 Miss ATP from Viña del mar - Winner (2009)

References

Living people
1989 births
Chilean female models
People from Santiago
Reality television participants